Sendets may refer to two communes in  the southwestern France:
Sendets, Gironde
Sendets, Pyrénées-Atlantiques